This page provides information on the most recently known control of localities in Ukraine during the Russo-Ukrainian War, which started in 2014 and escalated with the 2022 Russian invasion of Ukraine. It includes all larger localities across the country, and additionally some smaller localities close to current or recent lines of contact.

Map of the oblasts of Ukraine. Russia gained control of Crimea and partsof Donetsk and Luhansk (the striped areas) prior to the 2022 invasion.

Cherkasy Oblast

Chernihiv Oblast

Chernivtsi Oblast

Crimea and Sevastopol

Dnipropetrovsk Oblast

Donetsk Oblast

Ivano-Frankivsk Oblast

Kharkiv Oblast

Kherson Oblast

Khmelnytskyi Oblast

Kirovohrad Oblast

Kyiv Oblast and Kyiv

Luhansk Oblast

Lviv Oblast

Mykolaiv Oblast

Odesa Oblast

Poltava Oblast

Rivne Oblast

Sumy Oblast

Ternopil Oblast

Vinnytsia Oblast

Volyn Oblast

Zakarpattia Oblast

Zaporizhzhia Oblast

Zhytomyr Oblast

See also 

 2022 Russian invasion of Ukraine
 List of cities in Ukraine
 List of military engagements during the 2022 Russian invasion of Ukraine
 List of urban-type settlements in Ukraine
 Timeline of geopolitical changes (2000−present)
 Timeline of the 2022 Russian invasion of Ukraine
 Template:2022 Russian invasion of Ukraine infobox
 Template:Russo-Ukrainian War detailed map
 Template:Russo-Ukrainian War detailed relief map

Notes

References 

Lists of populated places in Ukraine
Russo-Ukrainian War